Vilmantas Dilys (born October 6, 1987) is a Lithuanian former professional basketball player. He is 2.08 m tall and can play both power forward and small forward positions.

References

External links
 Euroleague.net Profile
 Eurobasket.com Profile

1987 births
Living people
Bàsquet Manresa players
BC Nevėžis players
BC Rytas players
BC Žalgiris players
CB Axarquía players
Forwards (basketball)
Liga ACB players
Lithuanian men's basketball players
Lithuanian expatriate basketball people in Austria
Lithuanian expatriate basketball people in Estonia
Lithuanian expatriate basketball people in Spain
People from Utena
University of Tartu basketball team players
Traiskirchen Lions players